Francesca Belibi (born July 20, 2001) is an American college basketball player for the Stanford Cardinal of the Pac-12 Conference. She drew national attention in high school for her dunking ability. In 2020, she became the eighth woman to dunk in a women's college basketball game. In 2021, she won the NCAA championship with Stanford.

Early life
Belibi was born in Kansas City, Kansas to Franck and Suzanne Belibi, who were born in Cameroon and moved to Belgium before coming to the United States. The family later moved to Centennial, Colorado.

High school career
Belibi started playing competitive basketball for the first time during her freshman year at Regis Jesuit High School. In 2017, she became the first girl to dunk in a game in Colorado high school history. In February 2019, she pulled off the first ever alley-oop dunk by a female in a high school game in Colorado. As a senior she averaged 21.8 points, 12.3 rebounds, 3.4 steals, 2.7 blocks and 2.3 assists per game. She was named a McDonald's All-American in 2019 and went on to become the second woman to win the dunk contest at the McDonald's All American Game, after Candace Parker who won in 2004.

College career
During her freshman season she averaged 6.6 points and 4.5 rebounds per game in 32 games, making six starts. In December 2020, she became the eighth woman to dunk in a college basketball game when she dunked with under a minute left in the first half of Stanford's victory against California. Eight days later, she had another dunk in a victory against UCLA.

On April 4, 2021, Belibi won the NCAA championship after Stanford beat the Arizona Wildcats, 54–53, in the national title game.

On March 19, 2022, Belibi had the third dunk in NCAA women's tournament history when she dunked midway through the second quarter of Stanford's 78-37 first round victory against Montana State.

National team career
Belibi has won three gold medals playing for the United States junior national teams, 2019 FIBA Under-19 Women's Basketball World Cup, 2018 FIBA Under-17 Women's Basketball World Cup and the 2017 FIBA Under-16 Women's Americas Championship.

Personal life
Belibi is listed 6'1" in shoes but 5'11" without them. She has a 6-foot-5 wingspan and a 31-inch vertical leap. Belibi has two younger sisters and one younger brother. Fabiola, the second born child will be attending Harvard university for track, Hana, the third oldest is a Junior at Regis Jesuit high school, playing girls EYBl with colorado premier, and her youngest sibling, Franck is a 6'2 13 year old who is a top 50 prospect via top 25 scouts and fox sports.

References

External links
Stanford Cardinal bio
USA Basketball bio

2001 births
Living people
American women's basketball players
Forwards (basketball)
McDonald's High School All-Americans
Sportspeople from Kansas City, Kansas
Stanford Cardinal women's basketball players
Basketball players from Kansas
Basketball players from Colorado
American people of Cameroonian descent